Polyspirella trachealis is a species of sea snail, a marine gastropod mollusk in the family Pyramidellidae, the pyrams and their allies.

Description
The yellowish-white shell has an elongate-conic shape.  Its length varies between 5.7 mm and 12.2 mm. The whorls of the protoconch are large, planorboid, smooth and  well rounded. They are obliquely immersed in the first of the succeeding turns, above which only the tilted edge of the last two volutions projects. The twelve whorls of the teleoconch are moderately rounded. They are shouldered at the summit, and marked by three strong spiral cords which slope abruptly posteriorly and gently anteriorly. These cords are about twice as wide as the spaces that separate them. Beginning with the third to last turn, the suture falls gradually more and more anterior to the periphery, exposing a portion of the base, which appears as a flattened band above the suture. In addition to the spiral cords, the whorls are marked by numerous, slender, raised, axial threads in the depressed spaces between the cords. These threads are about one-fourth as wide as the spaces that separate them. The suture is scarcely differentiated from the other grooves. The periphery of the body whorl is well rounded. The base of the shell is rather short, and well rounded. It is marked by incremental lines and exceedingly fine, spiral striations. The aperture is broadly ovate. The  posterior angle is acute. The outer lip is thin, showing the external sculpture within. The columella is somewhat twisted. It is provided with an obsolete fold at its insertion.

Distribution
The type specimen was found off Cape of Good Hope, South Africa.

References

 Odé, H. (1998). Indo-Pacific taxa of turbonilids, excluding those along the Americas. Texas Conchologist. 34 (2): 33-103
 Van Aartsen J.J. & Corgan J.X. (1996) South African pyramidellacean gastropod names. Basteria 60: 153-160

External links
 To World Register of Marine Species
 Gould, A. A. (1861). Description of new shells collected by the United States North Pacific Exploring Expedition. Proceedings of the Boston Society of Natural History. 7: 385-389 

Pyramidellidae
Gastropods described in 1861